The event was not held the previous year.

Ivan Lendl and Bill Scanlon won the title, defeating Peter Doohan and Laurie Warder 6–7, 6–3, 6–4 in the final.

Seeds

  John Fitzgerald /  Mark Kratzmann (quarterfinals)
  Broderick Dyke /  Wally Masur (first round)
  Eddie Edwards /  Christo van Rensburg (quarterfinals)
  Brad Drewett /  Mark Edmondson (quarterfinals)

Draw

Draw

References
Draw

Next Generation Adelaide International
1987 Grand Prix (tennis)
1987 in Australian tennis